The Sound of Summer Running is a 1998 studio album by jazz bassist Marc Johnson released by Verve Records. It features an all-star Quartet with guitarists Pat Metheny and Bill Frisell, and John Zorn's frequent drummer Joey Baron. The title was borrowed from a story by Ray Bradbury.

Reception
Scott Yanow, writing for Allmusic, awarded the album three stars out of five, stating: 

JazzTimes critic Bill Milkowski, in his review of the album wrote: "... Johnson’s Verve debut is bound to send ripples of excitement through the guitar community. “Put Frisell with just about anybody and you’re going to create something exciting,” says Johnson... Ross Porter in his book The Essential Jazz Recordings: 101 CDs praised Johnson's performance, commenting, "On The Sound of Summer Running Marc Johnson has created both a showcase for his own and others' virtuosity. He plays with warmth and poignancy, and like all great bass players knows his place, never getting in the way. Johnson has made a great record, one that is very satysfying to listen to." The Buffalo News review by Jeff Simon noted, "Irresistible -- a sunbath of a disc by the great bassist that somehow managed to pair guitarists Bill Frisell and Pat Metheny in music virtually impossible to dislike... It's the sort of jazz that has hit potential without compromising all integrity. Summery charm, after all, is the whole point of the disc."

Track listing

Personnel
Marc Johnson – double bass
Bill Frisell – electric and acoustic guitars
Pat Metheny – electric and acoustic guitars, 42-string Pikasso guitar
Joey Baron – drums, tambourine

Production
Joe Ferla – engineer 
Greg Calbi – mastering 
Lee Townsend – producer

Notes 
Recorded at Avatar Studios, New York City
Mixed at Sony Music Studios, New York City
Mastered at Masterdisk, New York City

References 

1997 albums
Verve Records albums
Marc Johnson (musician) albums